Harold Marshall Sylvester Richards Sr. (August 28, 1894 – April 24, 1985), commonly known as H. M. S. Richards, was a well-known Seventh-day Adventist evangelist and author.

Born in Iowa, he is most famous for founding the Voice of Prophecy radio ministry and was a pioneer in religious radio broadcasting. His ministry inspired broadcasts in 36 languages on more than 1,100 stations, and Bible courses in 80 languages offered by 144 correspondence schools.

Early life

Richards began his ministry as a tent preacher when he was 17. His brother worked as a driver for then Senator Warren G. Harding. Harding invited him to see a demonstration of the newly invented radio. Richards came to view radio as a way to bring the Gospel to nations. He came to California during the Great Depression and made radio broadcasts starting in 1929, when he gave a 15-minute guest sermon on KNX in Los Angeles. He noted that every six days 1,000,000 more people come into the world. He viewed the radio as a way of keeping up with these new additions to the human race.

Richards married Mabel Annabel Eastman in 1920, and they had 1 daughter and 3 sons. He died in 1985 at the age of 90. In 1940, Richards ran on a very limited budget. By contrast, in 1980, he had a $6 million budget and a staff of researchers to help him avoid early foibles.

Radio broadcasting
Upon graduation from Washington Missionary College (now Washington Adventist University) in 1919, H.M.S. Richards served as an evangelist in various places in the United States and Canada and during this period experimented with radio announcements in connection with his meetings.
He began regular radio broadcasts on October 19, 1929 on KNX (AM) in Los Angeles.

Later Richards presented daily live broadcasts of The Tabernacle of the Air over KGER in Long Beach, and live weekly remote broadcasts from his tabernacle to KMPC (AM) in Beverly Hills.

In his presentations he taught history. "Bible prophecy is not given so we can see what will happen, but so we can see what already happened, and get confirmation that the Bible is true. If it came true historically, then when Jesus gives his wonderful teachings, we ought to believe that, too," he noted.

In January 1937 his radio footprint expanded over a network of several stations of the Don Lee Broadcasting System, and the name of the broadcast was changed to the Voice of Prophecy.

His first coast-to-coast broadcast over 89 stations of the Mutual Broadcasting System was on Sunday, January 4, 1942.

Throughout the years Richards' Voice of Prophecy broadcasts were marked by an opening theme song of "Lift Up the Trumpet" performed by the King's Heralds quartet and closed with his poem "Have Faith in God" each week having a new verse written.

As an author
In addition to published sermons and booklets, Richards authored the following books:
The Indispensable Man
The Promises of God
What Jesus Said
Feed My Sheep
Look to the Stars
Why I Am a Seventh-day Adventist
One World
Revival Sermons
Day After Tomorrow

Awards and biographies
Awarded the Honor Citation by the National Religious Broadcasters in 1967 and 1970.
Honorary doctorate conferred by Andrews University in 1960.
Washington Adventist University's faculty of religion building "HMS Richards Hall" on Flower Ave, Takoma Park, MD is named in his honor
La Sierra University renamed its School of Religion the "H.M.S. Richards Divinity School" and has also designated an "H.M.S. Richards Library" to honor him for his work in the Seventh-day Adventist Church.

His life has been the subject of two biographies:
H.M.S. Richards Man Alive by his daughter Virginia Cason
H.M.S. Richards: A Biography by Robert E. Edwards, longtime member of the King's Heralds

See also 

 Seventh-day Adventist Church
 Seventh-day Adventist theology
 Seventh-day Adventist eschatology
 History of the Seventh-day Adventist Church
 28 Fundamental Beliefs
 Questions on Doctrine
 Teachings of Ellen G. White
 Inspiration of Ellen G. White
 Prophecy in the Seventh-day Adventist Church
 Investigative judgment
 Pillars of Adventism
 Second Coming
 Conditional Immortality
 Historicism
 Three Angels' Messages
 Sabbath in seventh-day churches
 Ellen G. White
 Adventism
 Seventh-day Adventist Church Pioneers
 Seventh-day Adventist worship

References

External links
 
 Biography on the Voice of Prophecy website
 John Robertson, "The Voice of H. M. S. Richards". Spectrum 13:1 (September 1982), pp. 36–43.
 H.M.S. Richards Library at La Sierra University, which houses Richards' personal library of approximately 10,000 books, and the majority of his private papers.
 Articles by Richards cataloged in the Seventh-day Adventist Periodical Index (SDAPI)

Seventh-day Adventist religious workers
American Seventh-day Adventist ministers
History of the Seventh-day Adventist Church
American religious writers
Christian writers
1894 births
1985 deaths
American radio personalities